KSTR-FM (96.1 FM) is a radio station broadcasting a Classic Rock format. Licensed to Montrose, Colorado, United States, it serves the Grand Junction area.  The station is currently owned by MBC Grand Broadcasting.

KSTR is also the radio home on the Western Slope for the Denver Broncos.

The station was originally KWDE in Montrose with its transmitter at the Raspberry Electronics site near Montrose. The transmitter was relocated near Grand Junction in 1983 and the station was moved to Grand Junction as well.

External links

STR
Classic rock radio stations in the United States
Radio stations established in 1980
1980 establishments in Colorado